David De La Peralle (born May 22, 1975) is a former American football offensive lineman who played five seasons in the Canadian Football League with the Toronto Argonauts, Ottawa Renegades and Calgary Stampeders. He was drafted by the Toronto Argonauts in the first round of the 1999 CFL Draft. He first enrolled at Vanier College before transferring to the University of Kentucky.

References

External links
Just Sports Stats
CFlapedia
Fanbase
LinkedIn profile

Living people
1975 births
Players of Canadian football from Quebec
American football offensive linemen
Canadian football offensive linemen
Kentucky Wildcats football players
Toronto Argonauts players
Ottawa Renegades players
Calgary Stampeders players
Canadian football people from Montreal